Marie Louise Mansell Randall  (1861–1965) was a politician in Guernsey. In 1924 she was elected to the States, becoming its first female member.

Biography
Randall was  born in 1861, the second daughter of Robert Randall, the owner of Randalls Brewery. During World War I she volunteered as a nurse, initially serving with the Voluntary Aid Detachment in Rouen, before moving to the First London General Hospital in Camberwell.

Randall contested the 1924 elections and was elected to the States, becoming its first female member. She remained a deputy until 1955. While a member of the States, she served on the Education Council. She was awarded an MBE in the 1954 Birthday Honours.

She died in 1965.

References

1861 births
Guernsey women in politics
Members of the States of Guernsey
Members of the Order of the British Empire
1965 deaths
20th-century British politicians
20th-century British women politicians